Samuel Stewart may refer to:

 Samuel Stewart (boxer) (1895–1950), American Olympic boxer
 Samuel Stewart (fencer) (1912–1950), American Olympic fencer
 Samuel Alexander Stewart, Irish botanist and geologist
 Sam V. Stewart (1872–1939), sixth Governor of Montana
 Sam Stewart (rugby league), New Zealand rugby league player

See also
 Sammy Stewart (disambiguation)
 Samuel Steward (1909–1993), novelist and tattoo artist